Gbehlay-Geh District is one of 17 districts located in Nimba County, Liberia. In 2008, the population was 32,176.

References

  

Districts of Liberia
Nimba County

 Gbehlay-Geh District is headquartered in Karnplay City.